The women's singles event at the 2018 Mediterranean Games was held from 26 to 30 June at the Tarragona Tennis Club.

Başak Eraydın of Turkey won the gold medal, defeating Fiona Ferro of France in the final, 6–7, 6–3, 6–3.

Veronika Erjavec of Slovenia won the bronze medal, defeating Lucia Bronzetti of Italy in the bronze medal match, 2–6, 6–4, 6–3.

Medalists

Seeds

Draw

Finals

Top half

Bottom half

References

External links
Draw

Tennis at the 2018 Mediterranean Games